Wetmore may refer to:

People
 Alexander Wetmore (1886–1978), American ornithologist and avian paleontologist
 Andrew Rainsford Wetmore, New Brunswick politician
 Annie Beatrice van der Biest Thielan Wetmore (1910 – 1997) ornithologist and benefactor
 Charles Wetmore (winemaker), American vinter and founder of Cresta Blanca Winery
 Charles D. Wetmore, of New York architectural firm Warren and Wetmore
 Edward Ludlow Wetmore, Canadian judge and politician
 Elizabeth Whitmere (born Elizabeth Wetmore), actress
 George M. Wetmore (1858–1923), creator of Shinola shoe polish
 George P. Wetmore (1846–1921), U.S. Senator from Rhode Island
 Henry C. Wetmore (1823–1862), New York writer and politician
 James A. Wetmore, Head of the United States Office of the Supervising Architect
 James Stuart Wetmore, Episcopal bishop
 Maude A. K. Wetmore (1873-1951), American political organizer, philanthropist
 Ralph H. Wetmore (1892–1989), botanist
 Raymond S. Wetmore, American combat pilot
 William Wetmore, founder of Cuyahoga Falls, Ohio in 1812
 William Shepard Wetmore, Old China Trade merchant
 William Wetmore Story, American sculptor, art critic, and poet

Places
 Wetmore, Staffordshire, England, near Burton upon Trent
 Wetmore, Colorado, United States
 Wetmore, Kansas, United States
 Wetmore, Michigan, United States
 Wetmore Township, Pennsylvania, United States
 Wetmore Hall, Salve Regina University

See also
 Wetmore Glacier, Antarctica
 SS Charles W. Wetmore, a whaleback freighter
 Wedmore, Somerset, England, mentioned in the 1086 Domesday Book as Wetmore